Aaron Tennant (born 1991) is a Northern Irish lawn bowler.

Bowls career
Tennant won the triples and fours bronze medals at the 2015 Atlantic Bowls Championships.

He won the British Isles Pairs with Gary Kelly and the 2018 Hong Kong International Bowls Classic doubles with Ian McClure. He is also a two time National Champion winning a pairs and fours title at the Irish National Bowls Championships.

In 2019 he won the fours bronze medal at the Atlantic Bowls Championships and in 2020 he was selected for the 2020 World Outdoor Bowls Championship in Australia.

References

Male lawn bowls players from Northern Ireland
1991 births
Living people